The Telangana State Police Department is the law enforcement agency for the state of Telangana in India. It has jurisdiction concurrent with the 33 revenue districts of the state. The police force was created from the remnants of the Andhra Pradesh Police after Telangana state was formed. It is headed by the Director general of police, Anjani Kumar, and headquartered in Hyderabad, Telangana.

Structure and organization

Telangana State Police Recruitment Board
The Telangana State Level Police Recruitment Board (TSLPRB) is responsible for recruitment. TSLPRB is releasing recruitment notification time to time and conducting a written examination, Physical test, Medical test, and interviews for selecting best aspirants for their department and the department has about 50,000 active personnel in the State

Districts
Each police district is either coterminous with the revenue district, or is located within a number of revenue districts. It is headed by a District Superintendent of Police (or simply called Superintendent of Police). Each district comprises two or more Sub-Divisions, several Circles and police stations.

Sub-divisions
Each Sub-division is headed by one police officer of the rank Deputy Superintendent of Police (Officers of Telangana Police Service are directly recruited officers or promoted from lower ranks) or an additional Superintendent of Police (Officers of Indian Police Service). The officer who heads a Sub-Division is known as S.D.P.O. resp. Sub Divisional Police Officer.

Circles
A Circle comprises several police stations. An inspector of police who heads a police circle is the Circle Inspector of Police or CI.

Stations

A police station is headed by an inspector (an upper subordinate rank). A police station is the basic unit of policing, responsible for prevention and detection of crime, maintenance of public order, enforcing law in general as well as for performing protection duties and making security arrangements for the constitutional authorities, government functionaries, representatives of the public in different legislative bodies and local self governments, public figures etc.

Commissionerate
A Police Commissionerate is a law enforcement body especially in the urban parts of the state. The commissionerate is headed by a Commissioner of Police. Hyderabad City Police, Cyberabad Metropolitan Police and Warangal Police Commissionerate are the local law enforcement agencies for the cities of Hyderabad and Warangal respectively.

Government of Telangana has issued ordinance for new commissionerates at Rachakonda commissionerate, Karimnagar, Khammam, Nizamabad, Ramagundam, and Siddipet.

Ranks
The Director General of Police functions from Police Directorate, located in the DGP headquarters in Hyderabad. He is assisted by a team of senior officers from the ranks of additional DG and IG of police to Assistant Inspector General of Police (AIG - a post equivalent in rank and status to the superintendent of police).

Police ranks
The Telangana State Police designates the following ranks:

Officers
Director General of Police (DGP)
Additional Director General of Police (ADGP)
Inspector General of Police (IGP)
Deputy Inspector General of Police (DIG)
Commissioner of Police (CP)
Senior Superintendent of Police (SSP)
Superintendent of police(SP)
Assistant Superintendent of police (ASP)
Additional Commissioner of Police (ACP)
Deputy Commissioner of Police (DCP)
Deputy Superintendent Of Police (DSP)

Sub-ordinates
Circle-Inspector of Police (CI)
Sub-Inspector of Police (SI)
Assistant Sub-Inspector of Police (ASI)
Head Police Constable (HC)  
Police Constable (PC)
Home Guard (HG)

Insignia of Telangana Police (State Police)
Gazetted Officers

Non-gazetted officers

See also
 Telangana State Police Academy
 Hyderabad City Police
 Cyberabad Metropolitan Police
 Rachakonda Police Commissionerate
 Ramagundam Police Commissionerate
 Warangal Police Commissionerate
 Nizamabad Police Commissionerate
 Karimnagar Police Commissionerate
 Khammam Police Commissionerate
 SHE Teams

Notes

References

 
 Government of Telangana
 State law enforcement agencies of India
 2014 establishments in Telangana
 Government agencies established in 2014